Hemitheconyx is a genus of geckos. Both species are found in Africa. They are known as fat-tailed geckos and often resemble leopard geckos.

Species
There are two recognized species in the genus Hemitheconyx:
Hemitheconyx caudicinctus (Duméril, 1851) – (African) fat-tailed gecko
Hemitheconyx taylori Parker, 1930 – Taylor's fat-tail(ed) gecko

References

 
Lizard genera
Geckos of Africa
Taxa named by Leonhard Stejneger